Café con aroma de mujer may refer to:

Café con aroma de mujer (Colombian TV series), a 1994  telenovela.
Café con aroma de mujer (2021 TV series), an upcoming American television series based on the 1994 telenovela.